Hankasalmi is a municipality of Finland.

It is located in the Central Finland region. The municipality has a population of 
which 
is water.  The population density is
.

The municipality is unilingually Finnish.

Hankasalmi is the only authentic rural municipality in Jyväskylä, that offers its inhabitants and guests a wide range of opportunities in the housing, work and leisure sectors. Comprehensive services and good transport links by highway and rail ensure smooth handling. Hankasalmi has several elementary schools, a high school, and a high school where you can take part in high-level navigation training.

Geography

Neighbouring municipalities are Kangasniemi, Konnevesi, Laukaa, Pieksämäki, Rautalampi and Toivakka.

There are all together 97 lakes in Hankasalmi. The biggest lakes are Kynsivesi-Leivonvesi, Armisvesi and Kuuhankavesi.

Villages 
 Halttula

History 
The name Hankasalmi was first mentioned in 1552 when it was a wilderness owned by the Tavastians of Hauho. The settlement has existed at least since 1559. In 1561, it was transferred to the new Rautalampi parish, which was largely settled by Savonians. 

Hankasalmi became an independent parish in 1802, but administratively it remained a part of Rautalampi until 1872, when the modern Hankasalmi municipality was formed. Parts of it were also taken from Pieksämäki, Kangasniemi and Laukaa.

Notable individuals 
 Aimo Minkkinen, longtime head of the Tampere Lenin Museum
 Antero Halonen, boxer
 Kaarlo Kartio, actor
 Kalevi Tarvainen, linguist and professor
 Kari Ihalainen, javelin thrower and track and field coach
 Lauri W. Pääkkönen, elementary school teacher and writer
 Matti A. Karjalainen, professor at the Helsinki University of Technology
 Matti Makkonen, politician
 Matti Rutanen, folk artist
 Mika Mölsä, crime journalist and fiction writer
 Niina Mäkinen, ice hockey player
 Onni Haini, journalist and writer
 Onni Pellinen, Olympic wrestler
 Paavo Rautkallio, politician
 Unto Poikolainen, Pesäpallo player
 Vilho Ylönen, cross-country skier and rifle shooter

Twin towns - sister cities
Hankasalmi is twinned with:
 Häädemeeste, Estonia
 Karmøy, Norway
 Mjölby, Sweden

References

External links
 
 Municipality of Hankasalmi – Official site

 
Populated places established in 1872
1872 establishments in the Russian Empire